In real analysis, a branch of mathematics, Cousin's theorem states that:

If for every point of a closed region (in modern terms, "closed and bounded") there is a circle of finite radius (in modern term, a "neighborhood"), then the region can be divided into a finite number of subregions such that each subregion is interior to a circle of a given set having its center in the subregion.

However, Pierre Cousin did not receive any credit. Cousin's theorem was generally attributed to Henri Lebesgue as the Borel–Lebesgue theorem. Lebesgue was aware of this result in 1898, and proved it in his 1903 dissertation.

In modern terms, it is stated as:
Let  be a full cover of [a, b], that is, a collection of closed subintervals of [a, b] with the property that for every x ∈ [a, b], there exists a δ>0 so that  contains all subintervals of [a, b] which contains x and length smaller than δ. Then there exists a partition {I1, I2, …, In} of non-overlapping intervals for [a, b], where  and a=x0 < x1 < ⋯ < xn=b for all 1≤i≤n.

Cousin's lemma is studied in Reverse Mathematics where it is one of the first third-order theorems that is hard to prove in terms of the comprehension axioms needed.

In Henstock–Kurzweil integration 
Cousin's theorem is instrumental in the study of Henstock–Kurzweil integration, and in this context, it is known as Cousin's lemma or the fineness theorem.

Cousin's lemma is now stated as:

If , then every gauge  has a -fine partition.

Proof of the theorem

Cousin's theorem has an intuitionistic proof using the open induction principle, which reads as follows:

An open subset  of a closed real interval  is said to be inductive if it satisfies that  implies . The open induction principle states that any inductive subset  of  must be the entire set.

Proof using open induction    

The set  is open, since it is downwards closed and any point in it is included in the open ray  for any associated partition.

Furthermore, it is inductive. For any , suppose .

If , we may form a partition of length  that includes . In the first case, we set , in the second we set . In both cases, we can set  and obtain a valid partition.
    
By open induction, .

Notes

References

Hildebrandt, T. H. (1925). The Borel Theorem and its Generalizations In J. C. Abbott (Ed.), The Chauvenet Papers: A collection of Prize-Winning Expository Papers in Mathematics. Mathematical Association of America.
Raman, M. J. (1997). Understanding Compactness: A Historical Perspective, Master of Arts Thesis. University of California, Berkeley.  .
Bartle, R. G. (2001). A Modern Theory of Integration, Graduate Studies in Mathematics 32, American Mathematical Society.

Real analysis